Aditya Kumar is an Indian actor who acted in film Gangs of Wasseypur II.

Early life 
Aditya Kumar was born in Bihar Sharif, Nalanda district, Bihar, India.

Film career 
In 2009, Aditya Kumar moved to Mumbai to pursue a career in acting. He was nominated as most promising male actor by Times in 2012.

Gangs of Wasseypur 2 
"Gangs of Wasseypur" is based on events in Dhanbad. It is a story about the "coal mafia" that spans several generations from 1941 to 2010 in two parts.

Filmography

References

External links 
 

Male actors from Patna
Living people
Male actors from Bihar
Indian male film actors
De Nobili Schools alumni
1978 births